The Green Path of Hope is an Iranian association established by Iranian presidential campaign candidate, Mir-Hossein Mousavi. It was founded on August 15, 2009 as the organizational body of the Green Movement. Mousavi described it as the "countless self-initiated and independent social networks" which form the body of Green Movement. It has also been mentioned as a "political front" in some media.

Name
According to Mousavi's advisor, Ali Reza Beheshti, Mousavi himself chose the name. He chose the word "Path" to avoid terminology such as "party" or "movement". He also chose the word "green" because of the green color symbol used by protesters, and the word "hope" based on a promise to establish a government of "hope" if elected.

Goals
The Green Path of Hope seeks to continue protests against the legitimacy of Ahmadinejad's presidency following lawful and peaceful ways, and the full execution of the constitution, as Mousavi says:

History
Mousavi did not name his movement as a political party or even as a movement, but a "path", because, according to Iranian law, parties and movements need to be authorized by the Interior Ministry and since Mousavi does not recognize the government as legitimate and the ministry is unlikely to grant him permission, he chose this name to bypass the law.

Mousavi is quoted in describing the movement:

According to organization officials, the movement functions on a campaign basis, including political parties, NGO's and social networks. Referring to the new movement, Mousavi has said "The Green Path of Hope is formed for the sake of people's rightful demands and for claiming their denied rights". He pointed that autonomous and spontaneous social networks in community are part of this movement. "During election our mottos chose and remained in constitutional frame work, today we are devoted to those slogans" he said. "We believe if people's demands were treated fairly and instead of using media to link spontaneous movements to foreigners, government promoted truth by fair criticism, they could satisfy public views", he added.

Methods
The way has six main members of the central council, that are connected to the reformist parties and movements, NGOs, and the social networks. The main body will be the ordinary protesters. The method is to create pressure from the lower parts of the society and make them connected in a social network, and therefore to lead the protests in a lawful way.

Members of the Central Council
The Green Path of Hope has three central leaders. Hossein Ali Montazeri also had a leading role in the movement in the earlier phase of the movement.

See also
2009 Iranian election protests

References

 
Mir-Hossein Mousavi
2009 Iranian presidential election
Reformist political groups in Iran
Political parties established in 2009
2009 establishments in Iran
Banned political parties in Iran
Iranian Green Movement